Montana is a 1990 American Western television film directed by William Graham and written by Larry McMurtry. The film stars Gena Rowlands, Richard Crenna, Lea Thompson, Justin Deas, Elizabeth Berridge and Darren Dalton. The film premiered on TNT on February 19, 1990.

Plot

Cast 
 Gena Rowlands as Bess Guthrie
 Richard Crenna as Hoyce Guthrie
 Lea Thompson as Peg Guthrie
 Justin Deas as Clyde
 Elizabeth Berridge as Lavetta
 Darren Dalton as Jim "Jimbo"
 Scott Coffey as Willie
 Michael Madsen as Pierce
 Jim Bishop as Chesler
 Dana Andersen as Fran
 Dean Norris as Foreman
 Michael Rider as John Donley
 Frank Salsedo as Joe "Hold His Gun"
 Timothy James Sampson as Sarge
 Tom Simmons as Young Surveyor
 Jack Vanderlans as Jack "Little Jack"
 John William Young as "Big Boomer"

References

External links
 

1990 television films
1990 Western (genre) films
1990s English-language films
American Western (genre) television films
TNT Network original films
Films directed by William Graham (director)